Lorna Brown (born 9 February) is a British actress and singer. She made her stage debut in the Olivier Award-winning West End production of Once on This Island in 1994, and since then has worked largely in television. Brown appeared in the long-running dramas Holby City and The Bill and the sketch shows French and Saunders and The Catherine Tate Show, before taking on regular roles in the financial thriller Devils, the mockumentary sitcom Hard Cell, and the fantasy horror series Vampire Academy during the early 2020s.

Her further film appearances include Gambit (2012), Les Misérables (2012), The Lady in the Van (2015), Taking Stock (2015), Terminator: Dark Fate (2019) and The Batman (2022).

Career 
After training at the Royal Central School of Speech and Drama, Brown debuted in the West End production of the musical Once on This Island (1994), playing the lead role of Ti Moune. Since then, her acting experience has taken her from the Royal Shakespeare Company and the National Theatre to television and feature films. Brown's 2008 feature film debut, won the Prize of the Ecumenical Jury at the 59th Berlin International Film Festival and saw her nominated for Best Actress in a Supporting Role at the 26th Robert Awards, the Danish equivalent of the American Oscars and British BAFTAs.

In 2004, she played production assistant Abba throughout the six series of the sketch comedy series French and Saunders, soon followed by a few parts in The Catherine Tate Show. From 2007 to 2008, she starred as regular Leanne Samuels in ten episodes of ITV's police crime drama The Bill, before making her guest and final appearance in the 2009 episode "One Year On". In 2016, Brown starred in the eighteenth series of the medical drama Holby City as consultant psychiatrist Naomi Palmer, a love interest for Adrian Fletcher and Raf di Lucca, and then took the recurring role of Vicky Bale in the financial thriller Devils (2020). In 2022, she appeared as Cal in Catherine Tate's six-part mockumentary sitcom Hard Cell, released on Netflix, and as Rose Hathaway's mother Janine in the Peacock fantasy horror series Vampire Academy, based on the novel series of the same name by Richelle Mead.

She has been in a number of theatrical productions, including National Theatre Live's Medea (2014), starring Helen McCrory, and Hamlet (2017), starring Andrew Scott and broadcast on BBC Two. She has also portrayed Erzulie in the revival of the musical Once on This Island (2009) and Gertrude, Queen of Denmark in the Royal Shakespeare Company's production of Hamlet (2018), with Paapa Essiedu in the title role.

Outside of acting, Brown has been a session singer with various bands and has worked with Gladys Knight, Courtney Pine, Eric Clapton, Lee "Scratch" Perry, Peter Andre and Terry Callier. She has also written, recorded and performed her own music.

Filmography

Film

Television

Stage

References

External links 

 
 Lorna Brown at British Comedy Guide

Living people
British women singers
21st-century Black British women singers
Black British actresses
Alumni of the Royal Central School of Speech and Drama
British television actresses
British actresses
British film actresses
British stage actresses
Year of birth missing (living people)